Patrick Zimmermann is a German professional vert skater. Zimmermann started skating when he was ten years old in 1996 and turned professional in 2003. Zimmermann has attended many competitions in his vert skating career.

Best Tricks Frontside 900

Vert Competitions 
 2006 Action Sports US Vert Championship, San Diego, CA - Vert: 8th
 2006 LG Action Sports World Tour, Berlin, Germany - Vert: 10th
 2005 LG Action Sports World Championships, Manchester, England - Vert: 8th
 2005 LG Action Sports Tour, Munich, Germany - Vert: 4th
 2005 LG Action Sports Tour, Paris, France - Vert: 8th
 2005 LG Action Sports US Championship - Vert: 9th
 2005 ASA Pro Tour, Cincinnati, OH: 5th
 2005 Mobile Skatepark Series: 5th
 2004 ASA Pro-Tour Year-End Ranking (Vert): 10
 2004 ASA Pro-Tour, Dulles, VA: 7th
 2004 ASA Pro-Tour, Cincinnati, OH: 6th
 2004 German Masters: 3rd
 2002 European Championships: 3rd

References

External links

 
 rollernews.com
 rollernews.com
 rollernews.com
 rollernews.com
 flickr.com
 xsk8.net

1986 births
Living people
Vert skaters
X Games athletes